Orthopodomyia flavithorax is a species of zoophilic mosquito belonging to the genus Orthopodomyia. It is found in India, and Sri Lanka.

References

External links
Mosquito species biodiversity in Phytotelmata from Western Ghats

flavithorax
Insects described in 1927